The non-marine molluscs of Switzerland are a part of the molluscan fauna of Switzerland. Switzerland is land-locked and therefore it has no marine molluscs, only land and freshwater species.

Freshwater gastropods 
Hydrobiidae
 Bythiospeum alpinum
 Neohoratia minuta

Land gastropods 
Pupillidae
 Pupilla bigranata (Rossmässler, 1839)
 Pupilla triplicata (Studer, 1820)

Agriolimacidae
 Deroceras juranum Wüthrich, 1993

Milacidae
 Tandonia nigra

Hygromiidae
 Trochulus biconicus
 Trochulus caelatus

Helicidae

Freshwater bivalves

Hothouse aliens 
"Hothouse aliens" in Switzerland include:

See also
Lists of molluscs of surrounding countries:
 List of non-marine molluscs of Germany
 List of non-marine molluscs of Metropolitan France
 List of non-marine molluscs of Italy
 List of non-marine molluscs of Austria

References

Further reading 
 Turner H., Kuiper J. G. J., Thew N., Bernasconi R., Rüetschi J. et al. (1998). Fauna Helvetica 2: Atlas der Mollusken der Schweiz und Liechtensteins. Neuchâtel: CSCF. 527 pp. .

Fauna of Switzerland
Switzerland
Molluscs
Switzerland
Switzerland